Slander the Woman is a 1923 American drama film directed by Allen Holubar and written by Violet Clark. The film stars Dorothy Phillips, Lewis Dayton, Robert Anderson, Mayme Kelso, George Siegmann, and Ynez Seabury. The film was released on April 16, 1923, by Associated First National Pictures.

Cast       
Dorothy Phillips as Yvonne Desmarest
Lewis Dayton as Monsieur Duroacher
Robert Anderson as Dr. Emile Molleur
Mayme Kelso as Nanette
George Siegmann as Scarborough
Ynez Seabury as Indian Girl
Herbert Fortier as Father Machette
Gino Corrado as Tetreau
William Orlamond as The Stranger
Robert Schable as Monsieur Redoux
Rosemary Theby as Madame Redoux
Irene Haisman as Marie Desplanes
Cyril Chadwick as Monsieur Lemond

References

External links

1923 films
1920s English-language films
Silent American drama films
1923 drama films
First National Pictures films
Films directed by Allen Holubar
American silent feature films
American black-and-white films
1920s American films